USS Pecos (AO–6) was a Kanawha-class replenishment oiler of the United States Navy. She was commissioned in 1921 and sunk by Japanese aircraft south of Java on 1 March 1942.

Operational history
USS Pecos was laid down as Fuel Ship No. 18 on 2 June 1920 at the Boston Navy Yard, Massachusetts (USA). During construction the ship was reclassified AO–6 on 17 July 1920. She was launched on 23 April 1921, sponsored by Miss Anna S. Hubbard and commissioned 25 August 1921.

During the two decades before the United States entered World War II, Pecos operated in the Atlantic and Pacific Oceans.

When Japan attacked Pearl Harbor, Pecos was in the Philippines supporting the ships of the United States Asiatic Fleet. She departed Cavite Navy Yard on 8 December 1941 for Balikpapan, Borneo arriving there on 14 December. After filling up with oil and gasoline, the tanker continued on to Makassar in Celebes, Netherlands East Indies where she refueled American warships fighting to slow the rapid advance of Japanese forces.  She departed Makassar for Darwin, Australia on 22 December 1941.

She departed Darwin on 23 January 1942 headed for Soerabaja, Java early in 1942 where she fueled Allied ships until departing on 3 February after a Japanese air raid made that port untenable. Tjilatjap then became the oiler's base until her cargo fuel tanks were empty. After fighting them off, the U.S. ships steamed south out of enemy land-based aircraft range and completed the transfer at sea in the early morning of 1 March 1942.

Whipple then proceeded towards the Cocos Islands to rendezvous with the tanker Belita, while Edsall was directed to return to Tjilatjap, carrying U.S. Army Air Force (USAAF) pilots and ground crew who had been passengers on Langley. The USAAF personnel were to assemble and fly 27 disassembled and crated P-40 fighters which had been shipped to Tjilatjap aboard the cargo ship .

At noon that day, planes from the Japanese aircraft carrier  located and attacked Pecos and struck again an hour later. For some time she sent out distress calls to any Allied ships in the area, as it was assumed the ship would probably be lost.  Finally at midafternoon, a third strike sank the Pecos. According to pilot Shinsaku Yamakawa of the Imperial Japanese Navy, the final attack was conducted by dive bombers from the aircraft carrier .

Executive Officer Lt. Commander Lawrence J. McPeake was posthumously awarded the Silver Star for valor for his actions aboard Pecos.  After the order to abandon ship was given by the ship's Captain, Commander Abernethy, Lt. Commander McPeake was seen engaging Japanese Aichi D3A1 "Val" dive bombers, which were machine-gunning survivors in the water. By some crewmembers' accounts, he was reported to have made it off the ship after it went down. Others reported him last being seen manning the machine gun. In fact, he did swim away from the vessel with another officer as it was going down.  However, his body was never recovered and he was eventually listed as Killed In Action after the war.

After Pecos was sunk,  raced to the scene and rescued 232 survivors. Many of the survivors, although visible by crew members of Whipple, were unable to be picked up and were abandoned at sea, due to the detection of what was thought to be two enemy submarines in the area at extremely close range. Out of over 630 total crewmen and Langley survivors on Pecos more than 400 were left behind and died. Exact casualty numbers for the doomed ships of the United States Asiatic Fleet and American-British-Dutch-Australian Command are impossible to gather because so many Allied warships were sunk in the Dutch East Indies campaign (at least 24 total) and many of those ships had already picked up survivors of other sunken ships and then were also sunk by the Japanese hours or days later.

References

Further reading

 

Kanawha-class fleet replenishment oilers
Ships built in Boston
1921 ships
World War II tankers of the United States
Ships sunk by Japanese aircraft
World War II shipwrecks in the Indian Ocean
Maritime incidents in March 1942